Weevils are beetles belonging to the superfamily Curculionoidea, known for their elongated snouts. Approximately 97,000 species of weevils are known. They belong to several families, with most of them in the family Curculionidae (the true weevils). It also includes bark beetles, which while morphologically dissimilar to other weevils in lacking the distinctive snout, is a subfamily of Curculionidae. Some other beetles, although not closely related, bear the name "weevil", such as the biscuit weevil (Stegobium paniceum), which belongs to the family Ptinidae.

Many weevils are considered pests because of their ability to damage and kill crops. The grain or wheat weevil (Sitophilus granarius) damages stored grain, as does the maize weevil (Sitophilus zeamais) among others. The boll weevil (Anthonomus grandis) attacks cotton crops; it lays its eggs inside cotton bolls and the larvae eat their way out. Other weevils are used for biological control of invasive plants.

A weevil's rostrum, or elongated snout, hosts chewing mouthparts instead of the piercing mouthparts that proboscis-possessing insects are known for. The mouthparts are often used to excavate tunnels into grains. In more derived weevils, the rostrum has a groove in which the weevil can fold the first segment of its antennae.

Most weevils have the ability to fly (including pest species such as the rice weevil), though a significant number are flightless, such as the genus Otiorhynchus.

One species of weevil, Austroplatypus incompertus, exhibits eusociality, one of the few insects outside the Hymenoptera and the Isoptera to do so.

Taxonomy and phylogeny
Because so many species exist in such diversity, the higher classification of weevils is in a state of flux. They are generally divided into two major divisions, the Orthoceri or primitive weevils, and the Gonatoceri or true weevils (Curculionidae). E. C. Zimmerman proposed a third division, the Heteromorphi, for several intermediate forms. Primitive weevils are distinguished by having straight antennae, while true weevils have elbowed (geniculate) antennae. The elbow occurs at the end of the scape (first antennal segment) in true weevils, and the scape is usually much longer than the other antennal segments. Some exceptions occur, such as Nanophyini, primitive weevils with long scapes and geniculate antennae, while among the true weevils, Gonipterinae and Ramphus have short scapes and little or no "elbow".

A 1995 classification system to family level was provided by Kuschel, with updates from Marvaldi et al. in 2002, and was achieved using phylogenetic analyses. The accepted families were the primitive weevils, Anthribidae, Attelabidae, Belidae, Brentidae, Caridae, and Nemonychidae, and the true weevils Curculionidae. Most other weevil families were demoted to subfamilies or tribes. Further work resulted in the elevation of Cimberididae to family from placement as a subfamily of Nemonychidae in 2017 and the recognition of the Cretaceous age family Mesophyletidae in 2018 from Burmese amber. The oldest weevils date to the Middle-Late Jurassic boundary, found in the Karabastau Formation of Kazakhstan, the Shar-Teg locality of Mongolia, the Daohugou locality in Inner Mongolia, China, and the Talbragar site in Australia. The extinct family Obrieniidae, with species dating from the Ladinian stage of the Triassic through to tentatively the Oxfordian, have sometimes been considered weevils. Genera of the family have been only found in three formations in Kazakhstan, with most named in 1993. However, their phylogenetic position is contested, with others considering it part of Archostemata.

A phylogeny of the Curculionoidea based on 18S ribosomal DNA comparison and morphological data conducted by Marvaldi et al in 2002 is suggested below:

Families
 Anthribidae—fungus weevils
 Attelabidae—leaf rolling weevils
 Belidae—primitive weevils
 Brentidae—straight snout weevils
 Caridae
 Curculionidae—true weevils
 †Mesophyletidae
 Nemonychidae—pine flower weevils
 †?Obrieniidae

Sexual dimorphism 
Rhopalapion longirostre exhibits an extreme case of sexual dimorphism. The female rostrum is twice as long and its surface is smoother than in the male. The female bores egg channels into the buds of Alcea rosea. Thus, the dimorphism is not attributed to sexual selection. It is a response to ecological demands of egg deposition.

References

Further reading
 Bright, Donald E.; Bouchard, Patrice (2008). Coleoptera, Curculionidae, Entiminae: Weevils of Canada and Alaska Volume 2. Insects and Arachnids of Canada Series, Part 25. Ottawa: NRC Research Press. .

External links 
 

 

de:Rüsselkäfer